Bryngwran Bulls Football Club were a Welsh football team based in Bryngwran, Anglesey, Wales.

History
The team were reformed in 2010 after a ten-year gap. Playing as a Sunday league side in the North Gwynedd Sunday League, the club won two league championships, two Presidents Cups and the League Cup. winners

The club joined the Anglesey League for the 2016–17 season, and were league champions in the 2018–19 season.

In August 2019 the club merged with Trearddur Bay United to form Trearddur Bay Bulls''.

Honours
Anglesey League
Champions (1): 2018–19
North Wales Coast FA Junior Challenge Cup
Runners-up (1): 2018–19 
Dargie Cup
Winners (1): 2017–18
Lucas Oil Cup
Winners (1): 2017–18

Sunday league
Presidents Cup:
Winners (2):
Runners-up: 2011–12

References

Sport in Anglesey
Anglesey League clubs
Association football clubs disestablished in 2019
2019 disestablishments in Wales
Defunct football clubs in Wales